Stupid Invaders is an adventure video game developed by Xilam and published by Ubi Soft for Microsoft Windows in 2000 and Mac OS in 2001. A 2001 Dreamcast port was handled by Titanium Studios. The game is based on the animated television series, Space Goofs.

The game was dedicated to Jean-Yves Raimbaud, the co-creator of the TV series, who died before the game was released. Unlike the original show, the game is also reliant on toilet humor and is slightly more adult in nature, making it the first work produced by Xilam to be for an older audience – before Xilam produced an adult animated film decades later, titled I Lost My Body.

Most of the staff members that are from the original series (only for its first season) produced the game. The main cast also reprise their roles as the main cast of aliens, some of whom provide dialogue for some exclusive characters. The game also features the additional voices of Billy West, Rob Paulsen and Laraine Newman, with Danny Mann (Gorgious) voicing an evil scientist from "Zero Stuff" and West voicing the antagonist, Bolok from "The Pro".

Plot 

The plot centers around the aliens and their attempts to return to space. However, a bounty hunter, the stoic yet serious Bolok, is sent by an evil scientist, to target the aliens. Thus, Etno's attempt to explain his newest idea goes awry as the aliens are frozen solid by Bolok's gun – which forces Bud to retreat to the bathroom. Once he sneaks to the rooftop and sneaks around the house, the player progresses through the large, surreal world within performing very specific (and often absurd) actions, like melting Santa Claus and reducing him into green ooze.

Gameplay 
All the main characters of the series are playable through the course of the game. The game rejects or distorts some clichéd aspects of the adventure genre, as standard adventure game tactics such as picking up, talking to, or interacting with anything encountered can often result in instant (albeit highly comical) death for the player's currently-controlled character and the need to reload, for example, often without warning. It should be noted the game does not support autosaving – players need to save manually before they progress any further.

Reception

The game received "mixed" reviews on both platforms according to the review aggregation website Metacritic. Daniel Erickson of Next Generation said that the PC version "would have been better as a non-interactive cartoon."

References

External links
Official site (archived)

2000 video games
Adventure games
Classic Mac OS games
Dreamcast games
Ubisoft games
Video games about alien visitations
Video games about extraterrestrial life
Video games based on animated television series
Video games developed in France
Windows games